Scharwenka is a surname. Notable people with the surname include:

 (Ludwig) Philipp Scharwenka (1847–1917), German composer and music teacher
 (Franz) Xaver Scharwenka (1850–1924), Polish-German pianist, composer, and teacher
 Klindworth-Scharwenka Conservatory
 Marianne Scharwenka, née Stresow (1856–1918), German violinist, wife of Philipp

German-language surnames
Surnames of Polish origin